Newquay Tretherras is an electoral division of Cornwall in the United Kingdom and returns one member to sit on Cornwall Council. The current Councillor is Kevin Towill, a Conservative.

Extent
Newquay Tretherras covers the centre, east and south east of the town of Newquay, including Newquay Tretherras School. The division covers 158 hectares in total.

Election results

2017 election

2013 election

2009 election

References

Newquay
Electoral divisions of Cornwall Council